The 75th Oregon Legislative Assembly convened beginning on , for its biennial regular session.

The results:

Senate: Democrats 18 seats, Republicans 12 seats

House: Democrats 36 seats, Republicans 24 seats

Democrats took control of the Senate in the 2004 elections, and of the House in the 2006 elections. The Senate had been controlled by Republicans since 1997 and the House since 1990.  Many Republican legislators resigned or declined to run for reelection in 2008. Democrats lost one seat in the Senate, and gained five in the House.

The Republican House caucus released an agenda for the 2009 session; priorities included improving economic growth, bringing accountability to state government, improving the state's education system, extending health care and extending in-home care for seniors, enhancing public safety, and managing natural resources.
House Majority Leader Dave Hunt (D–Gladstone) responded to the agenda in July 2008, characterizing it as a departure from the failed policies of the George W. Bush administration, and stating that the problems Republicans seek to solve resulted from 14 years of Republican leadership. The House Democrats also released an agenda for 2009.

The legislature, in its 2009 regular session, worked to close a budget shortfall brought on by the economic recession. One critical factor in the legislature's work is the fact that Democrats hold three fifths of the seats in each chamber, theoretically providing the three-fifths supermajority support required by the Oregon Constitution for bills to increase revenue.

In the effort to balance the budget, bills were passed to raise income taxes on corporations and wealthy individuals and households. This is expected to raise US$733 million in revenue over the next two years, which is meant to lessen the need to make spending cuts to state services and programs.
Opponents led an effort to force a statewide referendum on these increases, which appeared as Measures 66 and 67 on the  special election ballot. They were both passed by voters and will take effect .

The 2009 Legislature passed two major new laws that had been unsuccessfully attempted for several prior years:

The Jobs & Transportation Act (the largest jobs bill in Oregon history) was passed with funding for the Sunrise Highway Corridor in Clackamas County, Newberg-Dundee Bypass, Woodburn/I-5 Interchange, Highway 62 extension in Medford, Beltline/I-5 Interchange in Eugene, and major new permanent annual road funding for all Oregon cities and counties. The Act also allocated $100 to ConnectOregon to improve air, rail, and marine infrastructure.

The Healthy Kids Act was passed to provide health insurance to 90,000 uninsured children and 30,000 low-income adults, which resulted in Oregon reducing the number of uninsured children by more than any other state.

Sessions 

The Oregon Constitution requires the Legislative Assembly to hold regular sessions once every two years,
but the body can hold special sessions called by either the governor or the body itself. Only four other states' legislatures hold regular sessions every other year: Montana, Nevada, North Dakota, and Texas. Until November 2008, Arkansas was the sixth state.
In recent years, the Legislative Assembly has considered switching from biennial to annual regular sessions, as recommended by the Public Commission on the Oregon Legislature. To test the idea, the 74th legislature called itself into a special session in 2008, calling it a "supplemental" session to the regular one in 2007.

Likewise, the current legislative body will hold a supplemental session in 2010, expected to start  and to last four weeks.
Among other tasks, the legislature plans to refer a ballot measure to voters to amend the state constitution to permanently change to annual sessions.
A ballot measure is required because all constitutional amendments must be approved by voters.
The legislature also plans to refer a constitutional amendment to voters to redirect tax rebate funds into a state reserve, or "rainy day," fund.

Notable legislation

2009 regular session 
In the effort to balance the budget, House Bills 2639 and 3405 were passed, raising taxes on corporations, and on wealthy individuals and households, respectively. HB 3405 replaced the corporate minimum tax of $10, paid by two thirds of corporations in Oregon, with a sliding scale: At the bottom of the scale, corporations with sales under $500,000 in Oregon will pay $150; at the top, corporations with sales over $100 million will pay $100,000. Corporate income greater than $250,000 will be taxed 7.9 percent for two years, then 7.6 percent afterwards. Corporate income below this threshold will be taxed 6.6 percent. Under HB 2639, taxable income greater than $125,000 for individuals and $250,000 for joint filers will pay a rate of 10.8 percent for the next three years, up from 9 percent; after that, the rate drops to 9.9 percent. Also, income higher than $250,000 for individuals and $500,000 for households will be taxed at 11 percent. These two bills are expected to raise $733 million in revenue over the next two years.

and the House passed them .
Representative Mike Schaufler (D–Happy Valley) broke with Democrats and voted against both bills, but Rep. Greg Smith (R–Heppner) supported HB 2649, and Rep. Bob Jenson (R–Pendleton) voted for both bills. On , despite expectations that the bills would pass the Senate as easily as they did the House, they "crashed in dramatic fashion"
when Senator Mark Hass (D–Beaverton), believing the proposed tax increases should be temporary, joined Republicans and voted against HB 3405. Because no Republicans supported the bill, all 18 Democrats were needed to pass the bill, but Hass's rejection left only 17 votes of approval. The Senate tabled both bills and started negotiations. On , after Hass promised his support of both bills if some revenue from the corporate tax increases were added to the rainy day fund, the Senate voted again and passed both bills.
Governor Ted Kulongoski signed them , over a month later.

Opponents of these tax increases said they would worsen Oregon's economy, and they led an effort to force a statewide referendum on these increases.

Electoral fusion was made possible in Oregon with Senate Bill 326, allowing candidates to list a maximum of three party endorsements on their ballot line.
This used to be legal in Oregon until 1958. Some have called this plan "fusion light"
to contrast it with electoral fusion as practiced in states like New York, where each candidate gets a ballot line for each party that endorses them. SB 326 also repealed a 2005 law preventing voters who already participated in a party's nominating process from signing an independent candidate's nomination petition for a partisan office.
The 2005 law was a response to Ralph Nader's 2004 US presidential candidacy as an independent, raising concerns among Democrats that similar candidates would hurt their chances of being elected.
The law drew criticism when Ben Westlund, then an independent member of the state Senate, ran for governor in 2006. He had to wait until after the primary election to start his campaign and verify that the voters who signed his petition hadn't voted in any party's primary.

Other significant new laws passed by the 2009 Legislative Session:

Jobs & Transportation: Passed the Jobs and Transportation Act (the largest jobs bill in Oregon history) with funding for the long-awaited Sunrise Highway Corridor in Clackamas County, Newberg-Dundee Bypass, Woodburn/I-5 Interchange, Highway 62 extension in Medford, Beltline/I-5 Interchange in Eugene, and major new road funding for all Oregon cities and counties.  Also allocated $100 to ConnectOregon to improve air, rail, and marine infrastructure.

Health Care: Enacted Healthy Kids Act to provide health insurance to 90,000 uninsured children and 30,000 low-income adults, which resulted in Oregon reducing the number of uninsured children by more than any other state.

Education: Expanded Head Start, Early Head Start, and Relief Nurseries, referred an amendment to the Oregon Constitution to allow state matching funds for K-12 school capital construction (passed by voters as Measure 68 in 2010), and passed record investments in community college facilities on all 17 Oregon campuses.

Business Assistance: Increased loans and created new grant funding for small businesses needing capital, invested in emerging industries, and broadened research and development tax credits.

Public Safety: Restored 24/7 Oregon State Police highway coverage after 15 years of drastic cuts, cracked down on methamphetamine-related metal theft, required DUII offenders to install ignition interlock devices to prevent further drunk driving, protected child abuse funding, and began to shift greater resources to crime prevention.

Environment: Helped businesses and homes become energy efficient, enacted new low carbon fuel standards to improve air quality, and increased protections for Oregon fish and sportfishermen by cracking down on California sea lions.

Veterans: Funded new Veterans Service Officers across Oregon, expanded educational opportunities for veterans, funded an emergency fund for military families, and referred a Constitutional amendment to expand the availability of home loans for veterans (passed by voters as Ballot Measure 70 in 2010).

Human Services: Expanded farmer's market vouchers for low-income families and seniors, provided more school breakfasts and lunches, more summer meals for hungry kids, and Oregon Project Independence for seniors at home.

Civil Rights: Passed the Oregon Workplace Religious Freedom Act to allow greater religious freedom in Oregon workplaces (in 2009) and repealed a 1923 KKK-inspired law that disallowed teachers from wearing religious garb in the classroom (in 2010).

Affordable Housing: The Housing Opportunity Bill created a new trust fund to increase affordable rental housing development, help more Oregonians become home owners, prevent homelessness; and maintain and expand the network of community-based nonprofit housing providers.

Fiscal Responsibility: Required for the first time a pro-active review of Oregon tax breaks each biennium.

Legislative Reform: Reduced the size of the legislative budget and the length of legislative sessions, while increasing public access. Created regular legislative committee days to streamline committee operations during legislative interim periods.  Referred to voters a Constitutional amendment to create permanent annual legislative sessions with strict time limits (passed by voters as Ballot Measure 71 in 2010).

2010 supplemental session 
On , the day after Measures 66 and 67 passed, Governor Kulongoski said, "It's time to say 'enough' to budgeting from crisis to crisis," and directed the legislature to take up an effort in its supplemental session to reform Oregon's kicker law. Instead of sending surplus revenue back to taxpayers as tax rebates, Kulongoski wants surplus revenue to be directed to a state savings account first, commonly described as a "rainy day fund," to help the state balance its budgets during future recessions. House Speaker Hunt said the legislature will focus on jobs, and said kicker reform is "certainly not on the list of definitive things we plan to accomplish."

Senate members 

The Oregon State Senate is composed of 18 Democrats and 12 Republicans. In the last elections, the Democratic Party lost one seat: District 27, in the Bend area. Democrat Ben Westlund, a former Republican, left that seat to seek the statewide Oregon State Treasurer office in the same elections. Despite the loss, the Democrats maintained a three-fifths supermajority in the chamber.

Senate President: Peter Courtney (D–11 Salem)
President Pro Tem: Rick Metsger (D–26 Mt. Hood)
Majority Leader: Richard Devlin (D–19 Tualatin)
Minority Leader: Ted Ferrioli (R–30 John Day)

<div style="float:left;text-align:left;padding-right:15px">

Senate committees 
Committee assignments were announced December 9, 2008.

Business & Transportation
 Rick Metsger, Chair
 Bruce Starr, Vice Chair
 Joanne Verger
 Larry George
 Peter Courtney

Commerce & Workforce Development
 Diane Rosenbaum, Chair
 Chris Telfer, Vice Chair
 Floyd Prozanski
 Laurie Monnes Anderson
 Larry George

Consumer Protection & Public Affairs
 Suzanne Bonamici, Chair
 Larry George, Vice Chair
 Diane Rosenbaum
 Ginny Burdick
 Fred Girod

Education & General Government
 Mark Hass, Chair
 Frank Morse, Vice Chair
 Rick Metsger
 Suzanne Bonamici
 Jeff Kruse

Environment & Natural Resources
 Jackie Dingfelder, Chair
 Jason Atkinson, Vice Chair
 Floyd Prozanski
 Mark Hass
 Brian Boquist

Finance & Revenue
 Ginny Burdick, Chair
 Frank Morse, Vice Chair
 Diane Rosenbaum
 Mark Hass
 Chris Telfer

Human Services & Rural Health Policy
 Bill Morrisette, Chair
 Jeff Kruse, Vice Chair
 Laurie Monnes Anderson
 Joanne Verger
 Chris Telfer

Health Care & Veterans' Affairs
 Laurie Monnes Anderson, Chair
 Jeff Kruse, Vice Chair
 Alan Bates
 Bill Morrisette
 Frank Morse

Judiciary
 Floyd Prozanski, Chair
 Brian Boquist, Vice Chair
 Suzanne Bonamici
 Jackie Dingfelder
 Doug Whitsett

Rules
 Richard Devlin, Chair
 Ted Ferrioli, Vice Chair
 Ginny Burdick
 Rick Metsger
 Jason Atkinson

Joint Ways & Means committee 

Senators
 Margaret Carter, Co-Chair
 Betsy Johnson, Vice Chair
 Alan Bates
 Vicki Walker
 Joanne Verger
 Rod Monroe
 Jackie Winters
 David Nelson
 Doug Whitsett
 Fred Girod

Representatives
 Peter Buckley, Co-Chair
 Nancy Nathanson, Vice Chair
 David Edwards
 Larry Galizio
 Bill Garrard
 George Gilman
 Bob Jenson
 Betty Komp
 Tina Kotek
 Dennis Richardson
 Chip Shields
 Greg Smith

Human Services Subcommittee
 Senators:
 Alan Bates, Co-Chair
 Margaret Carter
 Jackie Winters
 Representatives:
 Tina Kotek, Co-Chair
 Mitch Greenlick
 Bill Kennemer
 Carolyn Tomei
 Dennis Richardson

Education Subcommittee
 Senators:
 Rod Monroe, Co-Chair
 Richard Devlin
 Fred Girod
 Representatives:
 Betty Komp, Co-Chair
 David Edwards
 Larry Galizio
 Greg Smith
 Judy Stiegler
 Gene Whisnant

General Government Subcommittee
 Senators:
 Jackie Winters, Co-Chair
 Betsy Johnson
 Peter Courtney
 Representatives:
 Nancy Nathanson, Co-Chair
 Bill Garrard
 Chris Harker
 Dennis Richardson
 Jefferson Smith

Capital Construction & InformationTechnology Subcommittee
 Senators:
 Peter Courtney, Co-Chair
 Margaret Carter
 David Nelson
 Representatives:
 Larry Galizio, Co-Chair
 Bill Garrard
 Dave Hunt
 Bob Jenson
 Nancy Nathanson
 Chuck Riley

Natural Resources Subcommittee
 Senators:
 Vicki Walker, Co-Chair
 Jackie Dingfelder
 David Nelson
 Representatives:
 Bob Jenson, Co-Chair
 Peter Buckley
 Ben Cannon
 Brian Clem
 Chris Edwards
 Jim Thompson

Public Safety Subcommittee
 Senators:
 Joanne Verger, Co-Chair
 Vicki Walker
 Doug Whitsett
 Representatives:
 Chip Shields, Co-Chair
 Jeff Barker
 Tim Freeman
 Nick Kahl
 Nancy Nathanson
 Greg Smith

Transportation & EconomicDevelopment Subcommittee
 Senators:
 Betsy Johnson, Co-Chair
 Rod Monroe
 Bruce Starr
 Representatives:
 David Edwards, Co-Chair
 Terry Beyer
 George Gilman
 Mike Schaufler
 Kim Thatcher
 Brad Witt

House members 

The Oregon House of Representatives is composed of 36 Democrats and 24 Republicans. Democrats gained five seats over the previous session, in which they had a slim 31–29 majority; the gain is the greatest accomplished by either party since at least 1985.
The 36-seat threshold is a significant one, as it gives Democrats a three-fifths supermajority in the chamber and allows them to pass bills which will raise taxes or fees without Republican support.

Speaker: Dave Hunt (D–40 Gladstone)
Speaker Pro Tem: Arnie Roblan (D–9 Coos Bay)
Majority Leader: Mary Nolan (D–36 Portland)
Co-Chair of Ways and Means: Peter Buckley (D–5 Ashland)
Majority Whip: Tina Kotek (D–44 Portland)
Deputy Majority Whip: Tobias Read (D–27 Washington County)
Assistant Majority Leader (Policy): Sara Gelser (D–16 Corvallis)
Assistant Majority Leader (Political): Phil Barnhart (D–11 Eugene)

Republican Minority Leader: Bruce Hanna (R–7 Roseburg)
Deputy Republican Leader: Kevin Cameron (R–19 Salem)
Republican Whip: Ron Maurer (R–3 Grants Pass)
Deputy Republican Whip: TBD

House committees 

Agriculture, Natural Resources and Rural Communities
 Brian Clem, Chair
 Suzanne VanOrman, Vice Chair
 Wayne Krieger, Vice Chair
 Terry Beyer
 Vic Gilliam
 Arnie Roblan
 Mike Schaufler
 Matt Wingard

Business and Labor Committee
 Mike Schaufler, Chair
 Brent Barton, Vice Chair
 Kevin Cameron, Vice Chair
 Chris Edwards
 Sal Esquivel
 Paul Holvey
 Bill Kennemer
 Greg Matthews
 Kim Thatcher
 Brad Witt

Business and Labor Subcommitteeon Work Force Development
 Brad Witt, Chair
 John Huffman, Vice Chair
 Michael Dembrow
 Sal Esquivel
 Paul Holvey

Consumer Protection Committee
 Paul Holvey, Chair
 Chuck Riley, Vice Chair
 Jim Weidner, Vice Chair
 Brent Barton
 Jean Cowan
 Vic Gilliam
 Wayne Krieger
 Greg Matthews
 Carolyn Tomei
 Matt Wingard

Education Committee
 Sara Gelser, Chair
 Michael Dembrow, Vice Chair
 Sherrie Sprenger, Vice Chair
 Chris Harker
 John Huffman
 Betty Komp
 Ron Maurer
 Arnie Roblan
 Kim Thatcher
 Suzanne VanOrman

Environment and Water Committee
 Ben Cannon, Chair
 Jefferson Smith, Vice Chair
 Vic Gilliam, Vice Chair
 Jules Bailey
 Phil Barnhart
 Cliff Bentz
 Debbie Boone
 Bob Jenson

Health Care Committee
 Mitch Greenlick, Chair
 Chris Harker, Vice Chair
 Ron Maurer, Vice Chair
 Scott Bruun
 Ben Cannon
 Chris Garrett
 Michael Dembrow
 Bill Kennemer
 Tina Kotek
 Jim Thompson

House Administration Committee
 Arnie Roblan, Chair
 Bruce Hanna, Vice Chair
 Kevin Cameron
 Dave Hunt
 Betty Komp
 Mary Nolan
 Andy Olson

Human Services Committee
 Carolyn Tomei, Chair
 Debbie Boone, Vice Chair
 Andy Olson, Vice Chair
 Jean Cowan
 Brian Clem
 Michael Dembrow
 Tim Freeman
 John Huffman
 Ron Maurer
 Suzanne VanOrman

Judiciary Committee
 Jeff Barker, Chair
 Judy Stiegler, Vice Chair
 Gene Whisnant, Vice Chair
 Brent Barton
 Kevin Cameron
 Chris Garrett
 Wayne Krieger
 Andy Olson
 Chip Shields
 Jefferson Smith

Land Use Committee
 Mary Nolan, Chair
 Chris Garrett, Vice Chair
 Sal Esquivel, Vice Chair
 Brian Clem
 Jean Cowan
 Mitch Greenlick
 Bruce Hanna
 Matt Wingard

Sustainability and EconomicDevelopment Committee
 Tobias Read, Chair
 Larry Galizio, Vice Chair
 Scott Bruun, Vice Chair
 Jules Bailey
 Vic Gilliam
 Chris Harker
 Matt Wingard
 Brad Witt

Transportation Committee
 Terry Beyer, Chair
 Nick Kahl, Vice Chair
 George Gilman, Vice Chair
 Jules Bailey
 Cliff Bentz
 Vicki Berger
 Debbie Boone
 David Edwards
 Mike Schaufler
 Jim Weidner

Revenue Committee
 Phil Barnhart, Chair
 Jules Bailey, Vice Chair
 Cliff Bentz, Vice Chair
 Chuck Riley
 Sara Gelser
 Tobias Read
 Nick Kahl
 Sherrie Sprenger
 Scott Bruun
 Vicki Berger

Rules Committee
 Arnie Roblan, Chair
 Chris Edwards, Vice Chair
 Vicki Berger, Vice Chair
 Bill Garrard
 Sara Gelser
 Bob Jenson
 Mary Nolan
 Tobias Read

Veterans and EmergencyServices Committee
 Jean Cowan, Chair
 Greg Matthews, Vice Chair
 Tim Freeman, Vice Chair
 Debbie Boone
 Sal Esquivel
 Betty Komp
 Chuck Riley
 Jim Weidner

See also 
 Oregon legislative elections, 2008

References

External links 
 Chronology of regular legislative sessions from Oregon Blue Book
 Chronology of special legislative sessions from Blue Book
 List of members of 2007 session from Oregon State Archives
 Official overview of bills considered during the 2009 regular session
 Official overview of bills considered during the 2010 special session

Oregon legislative sessions
2010 in American politics
2009 in American politics
2009 in Oregon
2010 in Oregon
2009 U.S. legislative sessions
2010 U.S. legislative sessions